Leandro Lázzaro (born 8 March 1974) is a former Argentine football striker, who is currently playing in Indoor Football.

Career

Lázzaro started his career in 1994 with Nueva Chicago in the 2nd division of Argentine football. In 1998 Lázzaro moved to the Czech Republic to play for FC Slovan Liberec. He helped them win the Czech Cup in 1999–2000 and scored twice in the final. He then joined AC Sparta Praha in 2001.

In 2002 Lázzaro moved to Italy where he played in Serie B (Second Division) with Salernitana and in lower leagues with Nocerina,  Ravenna Calcio, Tivoli and Pro Sesto before returning to Argentina in 2006 to join Tigre.

In his first season with Tigre he helped them to gain promotion to the Primera Division Argentina. He stayed with the club and become an important part of the squad playing their first season at the top level of Argentine football since 1980. Lázzaro finished the Apertura 2007 as the club's top scorer with 10 goals in 18 games, helping Tigre to finish in 2nd place, the best league finish in the club's history.

In January 2008 signed for Estudiantes for a fee of $300,000 but he returned to Tigre after only half a season with Estudiantes.

Honours
 Slovan Liberec
Czech Cup: 1999–2000

References

External links
 Argentine Primera statistics  
 Football-Lineups player profile
 

1974 births
Living people
Footballers from Buenos Aires
Argentine footballers
Association football forwards
Nueva Chicago footballers
U.S. Salernitana 1919 players
Ravenna F.C. players
Club Atlético Tigre footballers
FC Slovan Liberec players
AC Sparta Prague players
Deportivo Merlo footballers
Estudiantes de La Plata footballers
Instituto footballers
S.S.D. Pro Sesto players
Expatriate footballers in the Czech Republic
Argentine expatriate footballers
Argentine Primera División players
Czech First League players
Serie B players
Expatriate footballers in Italy
Argentine expatriate sportspeople in Italy